{{DISPLAYTITLE:C15H10O2}}
The molecular formula C15H10O2 (molar mass : 222.23 g/mol, exact mass : 222.06807954) may refer to:
 Aurone
 Flavone
 2-Methylanthraquinone
 Phenindione
 3-phenylchromen-4-one, the backbone of isoflavonoids